Evelina Tshabalala (born 1965), a South African marathon runner and mountaineer, has climbed Aconcagua and Mount Kilimanjaro, despite being infected with the AIDS virus.

References 

1965 births
Living people
South African mountain climbers
South African female long-distance runners
Female climbers